Maran is a town in Maran District, Pahang, Malaysia. Bandar Tun Abdul Razak, Jengka is located in outskirt of the town. Surrounded by isolated forest and oil palm plantations mainly in the area of FELDA Jengka, Maran town is roughly halfway between Temerloh and Kuantan.

Economy

Main economy activities in Maran is plantation mainly by the largest settlement of FELDA in Malaysia, the Jengka Settlement. Other economy activities are focuses on small enterprises in agriculture, farming and fishing.

Transportation

Public transport
Maran, as with Kuantan and most of eastern Pahang, is not served by any rail line. rapidKuantan buses also do not cover Maran currently. Instead there are Cityliner buses that connect Maran to Kuantan and Jerantut.

Car
In contrast, going to Maran is much easier by car. The East Coast Expressway has two exits serving Maran constituency: Exit 825 to Maran and Exit 827 to Sri Jaya.

The old Kuala Lumpur-Kuantan federal road Federal Route 2 runs through downtown Maran. Federal Route 64 connects Maran to Jerantut. Connection to Pekan, the royal capital of Pahang is also possible through a series of state-level roads and then Federal Route 82.

Politics

Maran in turn is divided into three state seats in the Pahang State Legislative Assembly:
 Chenor
 Kuala Sentul
 Luit
in which all three are also currently held by UMNO.
Another state constituency, Jengka, is under the administration of the Maran District Council but is represented under Kuala Krau parliamentary constituency.

References

External links 

Official website of Maran District Council

• https://en.m.wikipedia.org/wiki/Maran_District

Maran District
Towns in Pahang